The men's hammer throw was a track and field athletics event held as part of the Athletics at the 1904 Summer Olympics programme. It was the second time the event was held. The competition was held on Monday, August 29, 1904. Six athletes, all from the United States, competed. John Flanagan, the reigning champion, defended his gold medal and set a new Olympic record. John DeWitt took silver and Ralph Rose bronze. It was the second consecutive medal sweep for the United States in the event. Flanagan was the first man to earn multiple medals in the event; he would finish with three consecutive victories, a record not matched by anyone in the hammer throw.

Background

This was the second appearance of the event, which has been held at every Summer Olympics except 1896. John Flanagan was the defending Olympic champion and had won at least 10 national titles across Great Britain, Ireland, and the United States; he was a heavy favorite. John DeWitt was a four-time IC4A champion. Ralph Rose was best known as a shot putter, but had been rumored to have thrown a monstrous 190 feet (57.9 metres). The lack of international competition meant that Great Britain's two-time AAA champion Tom Nicolson was absent. Also not competing was Alfred Plaw, who had beaten Flanagan to win the AAU championship in 1904.

Competition format

The format of the competition is unclear. The throwing area was a seven-foot circle.

Records

These were the standing world and Olympic records (in metres) prior to the 1904 Summer Olympics.

* unofficial - The IAAF didn't begin to recognize World Records in this event until 1912.

John Flanagan bettered the only Olympic record with 51.23 meters.

Schedule

Results

References

Sources
 

Athletics at the 1904 Summer Olympics
Hammer throw at the Olympics